Harding is an unincorporated community in Bourbon County, Kansas, United States.

History
A post office was established at Harding in 1888, and remained in operation until it was discontinued in 1933. The community was named for Russell Harding, a railroad official.

References

Further reading

External links
 Bourbon County maps: Current, Historic - KDOT

Unincorporated communities in Bourbon County, Kansas
Unincorporated communities in Kansas